Maximum time in grade in a military force is the longest amount of time that an officer or enlisted man is allowed to remain in the service without being promoted. If the soldier has not been promoted by the time he reaches MTIG, he is discharged from the service. Today, a recruit may enter the service at 17 years old and stay in service until age 65, for a total of 48 years of service.

Record holder 
The record holder for the longest enlisted service is Chief Torpedoeman Harry Simond Morris (1887-1975), who entered the U.S. Navy at age 15 as an apprentice boy, and served for 55 years of continuous service, a record that cannot be surpassed under current regulations. 

Morris was the last living apprentice boy entitled to wear the apprentice "knot" on his uniform, and he was the founder and chairman of the "Great White Fleet Association," which held annual reunion dinners to commemorate the cruise at the U. S. Grant Hotel in downtown San Diego.

References 

Military ranks of the United States